Barina is a barrio in the municipality of Yauco, Puerto Rico. Its population in 2010 was 5,930.

History
Puerto Rico was ceded by Spain in the aftermath of the Spanish–American War under the terms of the Treaty of Paris of 1898 and became an unincorporated territory of the United States. In 1899, the United States Department of War conducted a census of Puerto Rico finding that the population of Barina barrio was 1,432.

Geography 
Barina barrio is located in the southernmost part of the municipality of Yauco, immediately south of Yauco Pueblo (downtown Yauco) and the barrios of Susúa Baja and Jácana. The Yauco River crosses it from north to south, forming a flat valley that is used for agriculture. The rest of the barrio is hilly and forms part of the Southern Karst region of Puerto Rico.

Demographics

Landmarks and attractions 

 The Guánica State Forest is the largest and one of the best-preserved dry forests in Puerto Rico and the Caribbean. The state forest is also home to several beaches:
 Atolladora Beach, also known as Yauco Beach, in the Ballena Bay is the largest beach in the municipality. It is located in the Guánica State Forest bordering Ballena Beach (in the municipality of Guánica) and Tamarindo Beach (in the municipality of Guayanilla). It can be accessed by road PR-333.

See also

 List of communities in Puerto Rico

References

Barrios of Yauco, Puerto Rico